Lonergan is a surname. Notable people with the surname include:
Andrew Lonergan (born 1983), English (soccer) football goalkeeper
Arthur Lonergan (1906–1989), American art director
Augustine Lonergan (1874–1947), US Representative from Connecticut
Bernard Lonergan, (1904–1984), Canadian Jesuit priest, philosopher-theologian, economist
Dan Lonergan, Australian sports commentator and writer
Dean Lonergan, New Zealand rugby league player and events promoter
Jennifer Lonergan, Canadian educator and nonprofit business executive
John Lonergan (1839–1902), Union Army captain in the American Civil War
Julia Lonergan (born 1961), Australian judge
Kate Lonergan (born 1962), English actress
Kenneth Lonergan (born 1962), New York playwright, screenwriter, and director
Lenore Lonergan (1928–1987), stage and film actress during the 1930s and 1940s
Lloyd Lonergan (1870–1937), New York scenario and screenwriter
Mike Lonergan, American basketball player, coach
Richard Lonergan (1900–1925), American underworld figure and labor racketeer
Sam Lonergan (born 1987), Australian Football player, Woodville-West Torrens coach
Tom Lonergan (Australian footballer) (born 1984), former Australian rules footballer
Tom and Eileen Lonergan, Peace Corps volunteers who went missing in 1998, presumed dead
Walter Lonergan (1885–1958), second baseman in Major League Baseball

See also
 The Lonergan Institute, a center of research at Boston College